is a Japanese visual kei "air" rock band formed in 2004 and signed to the independent label Euclid Agency (sublabel Zany Zap). Despite not actually performing the instruments themselves during concerts, they have gained popularity through their theatrical "live shows".

History
The band was formed in 2004 by vocalist Shō Kiryūin and guitarist Yutaka Kyan. The band's concept was "Hyper Giga Hybrid Super Subculture Visual Rock". Teppei Chimatsuri joined as the first drummer and keyboardist; when he left later, Dankichi Tenkujō took over as drummer. Jun Utahiroba joined as bassist on 22 April 2007. On 5 April 2009, Dankichi left the band, and on 10 April 2009, Kenji Darvish joined as a drummer.

None of the members except Shō Kiryūin play instruments for the band. The band's studio recordings are done by professional musicians, as attested to by the group members themselves. Shō Kiryūin writes the music and lyrics, and creates the arrangements with Tatsuo of Everset. In concert, the band members don't play their instruments; instead they dance and perform and act out dramas with the aid of videos. Akiho Minami of Japanese pop culture website Real Sound suggests this may have been influenced by Malice Mizer, whose guitarists Mana and Közi would put down their instruments and dance during certain songs. Shō Kiryūin is the only member who always sings live. The band's creative output, including songs, music videos, promotional videos and performances, contains parodies of famous bands, artists, manga and other aspects of Japanese popular culture.

Their first single, "Dakishimete Schwarz", was released on 1 May 2008, followed by four more consecutive singles. Their first two albums, The Golden J-Pops and Renai Shuukyouron, went on sale on 24 December 2007, and their first live DVD was released that same day. In 2009, Golden Bomber had 12 consecutive one-man concerts on the 1st day of each month and performed a country-wide "4646" tour. Their most famous song, "Memeshikute", was released as a single on 21 October 2009.

Through 2010 they continued putting on their one-man concerts during the "Oneman Kowai" and "Zenryoku Baka" tours, and they released 12 consecutive monthly songs on dwango.jp. All the songs released on dwango reached No. 1 in dwango daily rankings. In 2010, the band was due to perform in Shanghai, China, during Expo 2010, but the performance was cancelled.

The popularity of the band increased significantly through 2010. By the end of the year, Golden Bomber had received major debut offers from seven companies, but rejected them all, preferring to remain a "good-for-nothing" indie band out of consideration for feelings of their fans. Their "Mata Kimi ni Bangou wo Kikenakatta" single reached No. 4 on Oricon weekly charts and was ranked No. 3 on the Oricon 2010 year top selling indies singles chart.  The Shimohanki Best album was ranked No. 3 on the Oricon weekly chart.

In 2011, Golden Bomber continued with the "Life is All Right" spring national tour (the initial name of the tour, "Isshou Baka (Lifetime Idiot)" was changed due to the earthquake and tsunami in Japan). In July, Golden Bomber performed at Japan Expo in Paris, France, and played two live shows in Seoul, South Korea, in August. The "Yareba Dekiru Ko" national tour was announced for autumn 2011.

On 14 and 15 January 2012, Golden Bomber performed at Nippon Budokan, and at Osaka-jō Hall on 21 January.

Golden Bomber also performed for two days at the Yokohama Arena on 17 and 18 June 2012. On 18 June 2012, they released their first international album, The Golden Best, in the UK, USA, France, Germany, Taiwan, and Korea.

Golden Bomber also hosts a program on Nico Nico Douga. The members have collaborated with different artists not only from music, but also from the fashion industry, with different fashion brands and game producers.

In 2014, Golden Bomber was featured in Japanese television commercials for Mr. Donut and Softbank.

In 2016, the band was one of the first acts announced for Visual Japan Summit, a multi-artist event hosted by rock group X Japan at Makuhari Messe on 14–16 October 2016.

In 2019, Golden Bomber released a song and music video titled "Reiwa" just hours after the new Japanese era's name had been officially announced.

Members
 (Vocals): 
 Born on 20 June 1984, in Tokyo.
 Writes all music and lyrics by himself. He can play various musical instruments, including violin.
 Created lots of parody songs of songs by famous singers and bands, imitating their melody, lyrics, singing style. For example, "Ultra Phantom" is Koshi Inaba, "Tsunami no Johnny" - Keisuke Kuwata imitation.
 A host of the All Night Nippon radio program, from 5 January 2011 to 29 June 2015.
 Released his autobiography "I’m Golden Bomber’s vocalist, are there any questions?" on 20 June 2012.
 Fan of Gackt and Malice Mizer.
 Made his solo debut with the opening theme "Life is SHOW TIME" from Kamen Rider Wizard.
On 4 September 2021, Kiryūin announced his marriage to his non-celebrity girlfriend on that same day.
 (Guitar): 
 Born on 15 March 1985, in Tokyo.
 He creates all the stage properties for the shows on his own.
Played main role in "Shi ga futari wo wakatsu made" film ("Iro no nai Ao" chapter) released in September 2012
On 21 August 2021, Kyan announced that he had been tested positive for COVID-19.
Has competed on Sasuke(Ninja Warrior)
 (Bass guitar): 
Born as Takayama Jun (高山淳) on 30 August 1985, in Chiba.
Graduated Nihon University, Faculty of Fine Arts Literature Department.
Writes an interview column called "No Ikemen No Life" about music artists in Monthly TVnavi magazine
Big fan of Jun Matsumoto.
On 25 July 2016, Jun announced his marriage to his non-celebrity girlfriend of two years. The private ceremony took place in June 2016. In March 2019, Jun announced that his wife had given birth to a daughter. The couple welcomed their second child, a son,  in August 2021.
On 6 August 2020, Jun announced that he had been tested positive for COVID-19.
 (Drums): 
 Born on 28 November 1980, in Fukuoka.
 Joined on 10 April 2009.
 Famous for doing white-black-red kabuki-like make-up
 Originally a guitarist, also did vocals in his previous band, now vocalist in Reverset.
 His blog is published as a book "The Best of Obama blog" on 2 February 2012
 Famous for appearing in the 28th, 30th, 31st, 32nd, 33rd, 34th, 35th, 36th, 37th, 38th, and 39th tournaments of Sasuke(Ninja Warrior).

Past members 
 Doramu: 
 Born on 13 August 1984, in Hokkaido.
 Left on 5 April 2009 at Takadanobaba Club Phase live.
 Drums: 
 Born on 15 March 1974, in Nagasaki.
 First air-drummer, also played keyboards on stage.
 Joined on 24 December 2005 at Roppongi Edge live.
 Left on 15 March 2007 at Ikebukuro Cyber live.
 He and Shō Kiryūin were originally colleagues of the same shop of Lawson.
 Doramu: 
 He stood in as an air-drummer and an air-keyboardist when Dankichi Tenkujo left, when Tenkujo returned he went back to being a staff member.
 He managed BAR of "Beer Bar Lemon Heart" in Tokyo. 
 Now, He is on manga-art cafe Care Zenon's staff, and the assistant of Japanese Manga "BAR lemon heart" .

Music relationships
Different musicians took part in Golden Bomber recordings, Golden Bomber also appeared together with a number of bands.
(Deluhi Leda, Janne Da Arc shuji, Ikuo, Hiroki, La'cryma Christi Shuse, Kishidan, Shokotan etc.)

Discography

Singles

Albums

Best albums

PV
01. Memeshikute (女々しくて)

02. Mou Bandoman ni Koi Nante Shinai (もうバンドマンに恋なんてしない)

03. Mata Kimi ni Bangou wo Kikenakatta (また君に番号を聞けなかった). 3 versions

04. Boku Quest (僕クエスト). 3 versions

05. Memeshikute (女々しくて) from Memeshikute/Nemutakute single. 2 versions

06. Yowasete Mojito (酔わせてモヒート)

07. Ii Hito　（いい人）

08. Sayonara Fuyumi　（さよなら冬美）

09. Chéng lóng hěn kù (成龍很酷) (01/01/12)

10. Dance My Generation (01/01/13)

11. Gomen ne, aishiteru (ごめんね、愛してる)

DVD

Limited distribution

Omnibus works 
 Tribute to Murakami (2007) Omnibus Release
 Featured song: Ikiteita Murakami
 Zany Zap Complex (22 July 2009) Omnibus Release
 Featured songs: Sick Lady Tabun.../Tsunami no Johnny/Motokare Korosu
 Neo Voltage (26 May 2010) Omnibus Release
 Featured song：†Za・VKei-ppoi Kyoku†

Songs written for other artists 
 The Boss - "Love Days" - lyrics and music by Shō Kiryūin
 Dancing Dolls - "Melomelo Bakkyun" from the single "Touch -A.S.A.P- / Shanghai Darling" - lyrics and music by Shō Kiryūin

Media

Drama CD
 Genpei Gakuen Kassen Roku (2010). Kiryūin Shō - Imai Kanehira role, Kyan Yutaka - Taira no Munemori role, Utahiroba Jun - Kisou role, Darvish Kenji - Kisou role

References

External links
 
 Golden Bomber on Myspace
 Euclid Group Official

2004 establishments in Japan
Atlantic Records artists
Comedy rock musical groups
Japanese comedy musical groups
Japanese pop rock music groups
Japanese rock music groups
Musical groups established in 2004
Visual kei musical groups